= Thurstonella =

Scientific classification
- Kingdom: Animalia
- Phylum: Arthropoda
- Class: Malacostraca
- Order: Amphipoda
- Family: Thurstonellidae
- Genus: Thurstonella; Lowry & Zeidler, 2008
- Species: T. chelata

Binomial name
- Thurstonella chelata (Barnard, 1931)

Synonyms
- Clarenciidae Barnard & Karaman, 1987

Genus of crustaceans

Thurstonella is a monotypic genus of crustaceans belonging to the monotypic family Thurstonellidae. The only species is Thurstonella chelata.

The species is found in Antarctica.

It was named after Michael H. Thurston (1937-2025), an oceanographer and world authority on deep-sea amphipods.
